The 1983 IBF World Championships (World Badminton Championships) were held in 1983 in Copenhagen, Denmark.

Medalists

Medal table

Events

References

External links
 First round
 Second round
 Third round
 Quarterfinals
 Badminton.de: Men's singles draw

 
BWF World Championships
IBF World Championships
Badminton World Championships
IBF World Championships
International sports competitions in Copenhagen
Badminton tournaments in Denmark
1980s in Copenhagen